Nadia Kjældgaard (born 2 November 1978) is a Danish retired midfielder who played for Skovbakken and the Danish national team.

International career

Kjældgaard was also part of the Danish team at the 2001 European Championships.

References

1978 births
Danish women's footballers
Women's association football midfielders
VSK Aarhus (women) players
Denmark women's international footballers
Living people